Sir James Robert Longden  (7 July 1827 – 4 October 1891) was an English colonial administrator.

Longden was born as the youngest son of John R. Longden, proctor, of Doctors' Commons, London. In 1844, two years after the establishment of a civil government, he was appointed government clerk in the Falkland Islands, and became acting colonial secretary the year after. In 1861 he was appointed President of the Virgin Islands, in 1865 Governor of Dominica, in 1867 Governor of British Honduras, in 1870 Governor of Trinidad, Governor of British Guiana in 1874, and in December 1876 Governor of Ceylon, which post he held until his retirement in 1883. Most notable of his tenure in Ceylon was his grant of land that established the Borella General Cemetery, that has since interred the names of many great Ceylonese over the centuries. He was made CMG in 1871,  in 1876,  in the 1883 Birthday Honours.

After his retirement he resided at Longhope, near Watford, Hertfordshire, and took a very active part in county affairs. He was a J.P. and alderman for the county under the Local Government Act. He died at Longhope on 4 October 1891. His funeral took place at Brookwood Cemetery on 9 October 1891.

Family
On 22 September 1864 on the island of  Saint Kitts, he married Alice Emily Berridge (1846–1910), younger daughter of James Samuel Berridge (1806–1885), a local landowner and businessman, and his wife Jane Chapman (1803–1888). They had six children, including:
Colonel Arthur Berridge Longden DSO (1868–1936)
Cyril Chapman Longden KPM (1873–1913)
Vice-Admiral Horace Walker Longden CMG (1877–1953)
Alice Emily Longden, who married in 1900 W. Engelenburg of Soerabaia, Java.

External links 
 
 Longden biography, specific for Trinidad and Tobago
 Description and image in Twentieth century impressions of Ceylon (Google books)

References 

 Dod's Knightage, 1891
 Colonial Office List, 1891
 Times, 5 and 10 October 1891

Civil servants from London
1827 births
1891 deaths
19th-century English people
Governors of British Trinidad
Governors of Dominica
Presidents of the British Virgin Islands
Governors of British Honduras
Governors of British Guiana
Knights Grand Cross of the Order of St Michael and St George
Burials at Brookwood Cemetery